Soest Zuid is a railway station located in Soest, Netherlands. The station was opened on 27 June 1898 on the single track Stichtse lijn and is located on an embankment. In 1963 a new station building was built and the station was moved 200 m. The station was previously called Nieuwe Weg ("New Road") (1898-1939).

Train services
The following train services call at Soest Zuid:

Bus services

References

External links
NS website 
Dutch Public Transport journey planner 

Railway stations in Utrecht (province)
Railway stations opened in 1898
Railway stations on the Stichtse lijn
Soest, Netherlands